The ICC Intercontinental Cup was a first-class cricket tournament organised by the International Cricket Council (ICC) as part of its cricket development programme. It was designed to allow Associate Members of the ICC the chance to play first-class cricket matches over four days against teams of similar skill in a competition environment and prepare them for eventual promotion to Test cricket status. First run in 2004, two of the most successful teams in the history of the tournament, Ireland and Afghanistan were promoted to Full Member and Test status, in 2017.

In October 2018, the ICC issued a media release asking for an expression of interest from teams who have competed in previous editions of the tournament. However, since no further news regarding a new edition have emerged since then, the future of the tournament was put into doubt. In April 2021, the ICC looked at the possibility of multi-day matches between Associate Members with One Day International (ODI) status, and Test teams who are not part of the ICC World Test Championship.

Tournament history

2004 ICC Intercontinental Cup

The inaugural ICC Intercontinental Cup was completed on 22 November 2004 when Scotland won the title in Sharjah, United Arab Emirates. Scotland beat Canada by an innings and 84 runs in the final. The competition included 12 teams, divided by geographical region into four groups of three. Each team played the other two teams in its group once each. The top team in each group then progresses to the semi-finals, and the winners of those to the final. In order to encourage competitive play and avoid deadlocks, a point system including bonus points was used.

2005 ICC Intercontinental Cup

Hong Kong came in to replace Malaysia, and the Cayman Islands replaced the United States who were ejected from the competition by the ICC because of then ongoing political problems within cricket in the US. The points system was also modified so that teams could score unlimited batting points in the first innings and a maximum of 4 points in the second innings.

The tournament was won by Ireland who defeated Kenya in the final.

2006–2007 ICC Intercontinental Cup

The tournament was cut from 12 to eight teams, with Hong Kong, the Cayman Islands and Uganda losing the right to participate, while Namibia knocked out Nepal in a play off for the eighth place. The match length was extended from three to four days, and each team was scheduled to play at least three matches. The teams were divided into two groups of four, with each team playing the other once and the top two teams qualifying for the final, and the points system has also been changed: 14 points are now awarded for a win, and six for a first-innings lead. Due to preparations for the 2007 World Cup and the longer tournament, the final was played in May 2007, where Ireland defeated Canada to defend their title.

2007–2008 ICC Intercontinental Cup

The 2007–08 tournament was played as a single round-robin league of eight teams, so that each team played seven matches. The teams ranked first and second at the end of the pool stage contested the final.

Namibia finished on top at the pool stage, but lost the final against second placed Ireland in late October in Port Elizabeth, South Africa. Ireland thus completed a hat-trick of Intercontinental Cup victories, having been undefeated in the competition, and having won three consecutive make-or-break away fixtures in Africa (against Namibia, Kenya and Namibia again) to clinch the title.

2009–10 ICC Intercontinental Cup

The 2009–10 tournament was expanded to two divisions and 11 teams. Ireland, the Netherlands, Scotland, Canada, Kenya, and Afghanistan played in the top division, joined by Zimbabwe A. Meanwhile, United Arab Emirates, Namibia, Bermuda and Uganda played in the Intercontinental Shield.
Afghanistan won their first title, beating Scotland in the final.

2011–13 ICC Intercontinental Cup

In December 2010, the ICC announced that the 2011–13 tournament would revert to the 8 team, single division format of the 2007–08 season and that the Intercontinental Shield would be scrapped. The sixth staging of the Cup ran from June 2011 to October 2013. and included the top six associate and affiliate teams with One Day International status (ICC World Cricket League Division 1); Afghanistan, Canada, Ireland, Kenya, Netherlands and Scotland. The remaining two places were allotted to UAE and Namibia who finished in the top two of the ICC Intercontinental Shield and ICC World Cricket League Division 2. Later the ICC Development Committee decided to select the 3rd and 4th placed teams from the ICC World Cricket League Division 2 (Bermuda and Uganda) and two qualifiers to proceed from WCL Division 3 (Hong Kong and Papua New Guinea) bringing the total to 12 teams. A 50-over tournament was run alongside the re-expanded Intercontinental Cup.

The final of the 2011-13 competition was held in December 2013 between Ireland and Afghanistan, with Ireland winning their 4th Intercontinental Cup title.

2015–17 ICC Intercontinental Cup

In the wake of changes announced by ICC following its revamp in January 2014 when India, Australia and England Cricket Boards gained more control it was declared that the next winner of the Intercontinental Cup would get an opportunity to play 4 tests (2 home and 2 away) against the bottom ranked test nation and if the associate nation wins that series they would then gain Test status until the next Intercontinental Cup. However, with Ireland and Afghanistan gaining test status in June 2017 the Test challenge was not held. Ireland, Afghanistan, Scotland, United Arab Emirates, Hong Kong, PNG, The Netherlands and Namibia qualified based on the results from 2011–13 ICC World Cricket League Championship, 2014 Cricket World Cup Qualifier and the 2015 ICC World Cricket League Division Two. It ran in parallel with the 2015–17 ICC World Cricket League Championship but with slightly different teams. As Ireland and Afghanistan had qualified for the ICC One-Day International Championship ranking qualification process, they were replaced by Kenya and Nepal in the limited over event; however they continued to play the four-day event. Afghanistan won the tournament after defeating UAE during the final round.

Team records

Overall Record

Teams' performances
An overview of the teams' performances in every Intercontinental Cup:

All time table

The abandoned match between Scotland and Kenya in 2008, the forfeited match between Zimbabwe and Scotland in 2010 and the abandoned match between Hong Kong and Scotland in 2016 are not included. Complete up to the end of 2017.

Key: TP/TW=Tournaments participated/won, M=Matches played, W/L/D=wins/losses/draws, Win%=percentage of games won.

Intercontinental Shield Record

In 2009 a second competition, the Intercontinental Shield, was introduced for the four teams placing 7th through 10th in the 2009 World Cup Qualifier. The matches are also first-class and the rules and points system are the same as for the Intercontinental Cup. The current teams in the Intercontinental Shield are Bermuda, Namibia, Uganda and United Arab Emirates. In December 2010 after the end of the Intercontinental Shield the ICC announced that it would be scrapping the Shield competition and returning to the 8 team Intercontinental Cup format of the 2007–08 season.

Complete up to the 2010 final between the UAE and Namibia.

Key: TP/TW=Tournaments participated/won, M=Matches played, W/L/D=wins/losses/draws, Win%=percentage of games won, a draw counts as half of a win.

Records and statistics

Team records
Highest totals

Source: ESPNcricinfo. Last updated 3 June 2015.

Lowest totals

Source: ESPNcricinfo. Last updated 3 June 2015.

Largest winning margins (by Innings)

Source: ESPNcricinfo. Last updated 3 June 2015.

Largest winning margins (by Runs)

Source: ESPNcricinfo. Last updated 3 June 2015.

 Largest winning margins (by Wickets)

Source: ESPNcricinfo. Last updated 22 March 2018.

Individual records
Most runs

Source: ESPNcricinfo. Last updated 27 October 2015.

Highest scores

Source: ESPNcricinfo. Last updated 3 June 2015.

Highest partnerships

Source: ESPNcricinfo. Last updated 22 March 2018.

Most wickets

Source: ESPNcricinfo. Last updated 3 June 2015.

Best bowling figures

Source: ESPNcricinfo. Last updated 3 June 2015.

References

External links
 ICC Official site

 
Intercontinental Cup
International cricket competitions
First-class cricket competitions